West Rosiclare Precinct is a former minor civil division which was located in Hardin County, Illinois, USA.  As of the 2000 census, its population was 460. It was replaced by Rosiclare Precinct in 2007.

Geography

References

Precincts in Hardin County, Illinois